Chiques Creek (known as Chickies Creek until 2002) is a  tributary of the Susquehanna River in Lebanon and Lancaster counties, Pennsylvania in the United States.

The source is at an elevation of  near Mount Gretna Heights in Lebanon County.

Name
The name of the creek comes from the Lenape Chiquesalunga, meaning "place of crayfish".

The United States Geological Survey Board on Geographic Names has made three official decisions on the name of the creek, deciding it was Chickies Creek in 1896 and 1916 before changing  it to Chiques Creek in 2002. The USGS Geographic Names Information System recognizes the following thirteen variant names for the creek: Big Chickies Creek, Big Chiques Creek, Big Chiquesalunga Creek, Chickesalapga Creek, Chickeswalungo Creek, Chickies Creek, Chickisalungo Creek, Chicques Creek, Chikiswalunga Creek, Chikiswalungo Creek, Chiquasatunga Creek, Chiquesatonga Creek, and Chiquesatunga Creek.

Course and watershed
Chiques Creek flows generally south for its entire course. Chiques Creek's major tributary is Little Chiques Creek, entering roughly one mile upstream its mouth. (hence the variant names with Big in them for the main creek).

Covered bridges
Five covered bridges cross the creek in Lancaster County:
 Shearer's Covered Bridge
 Kauffman's Distillery Covered Bridge
 Schenck's Mill Covered Bridge
 Siegrist's Mill Covered Bridge
 Forry's Mill Covered Bridge

Tributaries
Donegal Creek
Little Chiques Creek
Dellinger Run
Hife Run
Boyers Run
Shearers Creek

See also
List of rivers of Pennsylvania

References

Rivers of Pennsylvania
Tributaries of the Susquehanna River
Rivers of Lancaster County, Pennsylvania
Rivers of Lebanon County, Pennsylvania